Bambusa brunneoaciculia is a species of Bambusa bamboo.

Distribution
Bambusa brunneoaciculia is endemic to Hainan province of China.

References 

Flora of Hainan
brunneoaciculia